Rosenman is a surname. Notable people with the surname include:

Howard Rosenman (born 1945), American film producer
Joel Rosenman (born 1942), founder of Woodstock
Leonard Rosenman (1924–2008), American composer
Samuel Irving Rosenman (1896–1973), American lawyer, judge, activist and speechwriter

See also
Rosenman & Colin, a defunct American law firm
Katten Muchin Rosenman, an American law firm